Mazères is the name or part of the name of the following communes in France:

 Mazères, Ariège, in the Ariège department
 Mazères, Gironde, in the Gironde department
 Mazères-de-Neste, in the Hautes-Pyrénées department
 Mazères-Lezons, in the Pyrénées-Atlantiques department
 Mazères-sur-Salat, in the Haute-Garonne department